Walker, Texas Ranger: Trial by Fire is a 2005 American made-for-television action film directed by Aaron Norris and based on the popular 1993–2001 television series Walker, Texas Ranger starring Chuck Norris, Sheree J. Wilson, Judson Mills, Andre Kristoff, Janine Turner and Steven Williams.

Plot
Texas Ranger Captain Cordell Walker, along with Rangers Francis Gage and Rhett Harper are involved in a shoot out at a bank, where a group of robbers take the tellers hostage. Ranger Harper kills two of the robbers while the leader is able to escape. A guided missile accidentally ends up in the hands of a thirteen-year-old boy, who does not know that three Koreans, who are very skilled in combat, are looking for it. The criminals go to the boy's house, where they murder his father. The boy manages to escape, but the criminals continue to hunt him down. Jimmy Trivette has to leave for a family vacation, while Gage is following the case of the boy, helped by new Ranger Kay Austin. As if that were not enough, a girl who had an appointment with Ranger Harper is killed and all evidence leads to him.

Alex follows the case of the ranger and Harper gets support from his aide Garrett Evans, while Gage and Kay Austin follow the case of the missing boy. The boy takes refuge at the home of his friend but criminals find it and try to take back the missile. Eventually, the boy realizes that the criminals want the missile guidance system and is aimed at the top of his father for help. Meanwhile, a man is found dead whom Ranger Harper had arrested years earlier and the evidence leads back to him, but just when Ranger Austin can prove otherwise the evidence disappears. Meanwhile, Walker kills one of the Korean criminals and Gage and Austin find a man who days earlier had attacked the Harper ranger with a punch and then take his blood sample, which is the same on the scene of the crime. The criminals are the guy but just before arriving Walker, Gage and Austin who kill the criminals.

At the trial against Ranger Harper, he discovers that the real culprit is Garrett Evans. Garret takes the defense hostage, but the rangers manages to disarm him followed by Harper knocking him down with a punch. After clarifying the story, the main protagonists leave the courtroom and go in the main hall. Walker leaves to return home, but the leader of the bank robbers returns, firing a gun. Rangers Harper, Gage, and Austin shoot him dead. Alex looks down to see a single bullet wound in her left breast and falls to the ground. The camera "takes off" upward, showing a "bird's eye view" of Cahill's unconscious body lying on the floor of the courthouse. The film ends, providing no confirmation of what happens to Alex Cahill-Walker.

Cast

Production
The U.S. channel CBS in 2005 decided to produce a TV movie based on the popular TV series starring Chuck Norris which aired October 16, 2005. Chuck Norris, Sheree J. Wilson and Judson Mills reprise their television roles.  Clarence Gilyard makes a cameo appearance; however, he's not credited in the titles because of his inability to participate in the main filming due to a family vacation.  Judson Mills (who was not originally planned in the script) was invited to reprise his role of Francis Gage. Nia Peeples, who played Sydney Cooke, was excluded from the screenplay. This was last film appearance for Clarence Gilyard after his retirement in 2002 following Left Behind II: Tribulation Force.

The film is independent of the events of the show.  Set four years after the last television episode, the story is completely new to try to give the film a fresh tone.

On October 17, 2005 the film was awarded Best Film of the Week on Saturday night. Chuck Norris stated that more Walker, Texas Ranger television films were expected. Trial by Fire was to be the first in a series of television films dedicated to the character of Walker, intended for broadcast on Saturday night.  Based on the low ratings, however, CBS decided to shelve the idea, while leaving open the possibility of future direct DVD releases.

References

External links
 

2005 television films
2005 films
2005 action films
2000s English-language films
American action television films
CBS network films
Films about bank robbery
Films about hostage takings
Films about the Texas Ranger Division
Films directed by Aaron Norris
Films scored by Kevin Kiner
Films set in Dallas
Films shot in Texas
Television films based on television series
Television series reunion films
2000s American films
Neo-Western films